Yusuf Çelik (born 27 June 1996) is a Turkish professional footballer who plays as a centre-back for Serik Belediyespor.

Professional career
Yusuf made his professional debut for Antalyaspor in a 2-1 Süper Lig victory over Çaykur Rizespor on 12 March 2017.

References

External links
 
 
 
 

1996 births
Living people
People from Manavgat
Turkish footballers
Association football defenders
Antalyaspor footballers
Süper Lig players
TFF Second League players